The men's 400 metres hurdles event at the 2016 Summer Olympics took place between 15–18 August at the Olympic Stadium. There were 47 competitors from 33 nations. The event was won by Kerron Clement of the United States, the nation's 19th victory in the men's long hurdles. Clement was the ninth man to win multiple medals in the event. Both Kenya and Turkey earned their first medals in the men's 400 metres hurdles, the former with Boniface Mucheru Tumuti's silver and the latter with Yasmani Copello's bronze.

Background

This was the 26th time the event was held. It had been introduced along with the men's 200 metres hurdles in 1900, with the 200 being dropped after 1904 and the 400 being held through 1908 before being left off the 1912 programme. However, when the Olympics returned in 1920 after World War I, the men's 400 metres hurdles was back and would continue to be contested at every Games thereafter.

There were several major absences from the competition: the 2012 Olympic champion Félix Sánchez did not return to defend his title as he had retired, Johnny Dutch (the world-leading athlete that season) had faltered at the American Olympic Trials, and the 2015 World Championships runner-up Denis Kudryavtsev was ineligible due to the Russian team ban for doping. The top contender was Kerron Clement – the 2008 Olympic silver medalist (and 2012 eighth-place finisher) showing a return of form to place second on the world rankings. The 2012 Olympic medalists Javier Culson of Puerto Rico (bronze) and American Michael Tinsley (silver) were other strong entrants, as was the 2016 European Champion Yasmani Copello of Turkey. Jehue Gordon of Trinidad and Tobago was another returning finalist from 2012. Nicholas Bett (Kenya's reigning world champion) was present but ranked outside the world's top forty.

Algeria and Cape Verde each made their debut in the event. The United States made its 25th appearance, most of any nation, having missed only the boycotted 1980 Games.

Summary

The final started with a false start. Javier Culson realized his mistake and walked off the track in tears before the disqualification card could be shown to him. On the restart, Yasmani Copello, the Cuban free agent running for Turkey in lane 2 was the first over the first hurdles. By the third barrier, Kerron Clement in 5, Annsert Whyte in 6 and Boniface Mucheru Tumuti in 7 had pulled even. Through the next two hurdles, Clement edged ahead with Whyte just marginally behind him. Through the final turn, Clement pushed his lead out to half a stride over Whyte, with Tumuti very close to Whyte on the outside. By the ninth barrier, Tumuti pulled even with Whyte. Clement was already on the ground after the hurdle before Copello began to rise. Another stride back in a battle to stay out of last place was Thomas Barr. But through what remained of the home straight, Clement began to come back to the field as Tumuti pulled ahead of Whyte, while Barr and Copello was making a final charge at all three. In the run in, Clement strained to successfully hold off Tumuti, to take the gold, while Copello closed strongly, barely holding off a late rush by Barr for bronze as Whyte faded.		

Behind Clement, all the other athletes set national records for their countries except last place Haron Koech, who watched Tumuti take the Kenyan record in front of him and Whyte.		

The medals were presented by Issa Hayatou, IOC member, Cameroon and Víctor López, Council Member of the IAAF.

Qualification

A National Olympic Committee (NOC) could enter up to 3 qualified athletes in the men's 400 metres hurdles event if all athletes meet the entry standard during the qualifying period. (The limit of 3 has been in place since the 1930 Olympic Congress.) The qualifying standard was 49.40 seconds. The qualifying period was from 1 May 2015 to 11 July 2016. The qualifying time standards could be obtained in various meets during the given period that have the approval of the IAAF. Both outdoor and indoor meets were accepted. NOCs could also use their universality place—each NOC could enter one male athlete regardless of time if they had no male athletes meeting the entry standard for an athletics event—in the 400 metres hurdles. The maximum number of athletes per nation had been set at 3 since the 1930 Olympic Congress.

Competition format

The competition used the three-round format used every Games since 1908 (except the four-round competition in 1952): quarterfinals, semifinals, and a final. The number of semifinals returned to 3 after being reduced to 2 in 2012. Ten sets of hurdles were set on the course. The hurdles were 3 feet (91.5 centimetres) tall and were placed 35 metres apart beginning 45 metres from the starting line, resulting in a 40 metres home stretch after the last hurdle. The 400 metres track was standard.

There were 6 quarterfinal heats with between 7 and 8 athletes each. The top 3 men in each quarterfinal advanced to the semifinals along with the next fastest 6 overall. The 24 semifinalists were divided into 3 semifinals of 8 athletes each, with the top 2 in each semifinal and next 2 fastest overall advancing to the 8-man final.

Records

Prior to this competition, the existing world and Olympic records were as follows.

The following national records were established during the competition:

Schedule

All times are Brasilia Time (UTC-3)

Results

Quarterfinals

Qualification rules: first 3 of each heat (Q) plus the 6 fastest times (q) qualified.

Quarterfinal 1

Quarterfinal 2

Quarterfinal 3

Quarterfinal 4

Quarterfinal 5

Quarterfinal 6

Semifinals

Qualification rules: first 2 of each heat (Q) plus the 2 fastest times (q) qualified.

Semifinal 1

Semifinal 2

Semifinal 3

Final

Results summary

References

Men's 400 metres hurdles
2016
Men's events at the 2016 Summer Olympics